The 1951–52 Princeton Tigers men's basketball team represented Princeton University in intercollegiate college basketball during the 1951–52 NCAA men's basketball season. The head coach was Franklin Cappon and the team captain was L. Charles DeVoe. The team played its home games in the Dillon Gymnasium on the university campus in Princeton, New Jersey.  The team was the winner of the Eastern Intercollegiate Basketball League (EIBL).

The team posted a 16–11 overall record and a 10–2 conference record. During the season, after winning the first three games the team lost six in a row and eight of ten before winning eleven consecutive games. The team then lost the conference finale against . This was Princeton's first invitation to the NCAA Division I men's basketball tournament.

References

Princeton Tigers men's basketball seasons
Princeton
Princeton
Prince
Prince